Kharki is a village of Himachal Pradesh, under Tehsil Kotkhai, Shimla district, India.

Village Profile 
As of Census of India 2001

Area details
 Area of village – 123 hectares
 Number of households – 56
Population data based on 2001 census
 Total population – 273
 Females – 150
 Males – 123
Education facilities
 Education facilities – Available
 Number of primary schools – 1
 Middle schools – 1
 Number of secondary schools	1
 College available within range – More than 10 km
Medical facilities
 Allopathic hospitals available within range – More than 10 km
 Number of ayurvedic dispensary – 1
 Primary health centre available within range – Within 5 km
Post, telegraph and telephone facilities
 Post office – 1
 Number of telephone connections – 18
Approach to villages
 Nearest town – Kotkhai
 Distance from the nearest town – 17 km
Land use in hectares
 Unirrigated area – 49.00
 Culturable waste (including gauchar and groves) – 70.00
 Area not available for cultivation – 4.00

References

Villages in Shimla district